USS Boulder (LST-1190) was the twelfth of twenty s of the United States Navy (USN) which replaced the traditional bow door-design tank landing ships (LSTs). Named after the county in Colorado, the ship was constructed by National Steel and Shipbuilding Company of San Diego, California. The LST was launched in 1970 and was commissioned in 1971. Boulder was assigned to the United States Atlantic Fleet and deployed in the Caribbean and Mediterranean Seas. In 1980, the ship was transferred to the Naval Reserve Force. In 1988, Boulder ran aground off Norway during a military exercise. The vessel was decommissioned in 1994 and laid up at the Naval Inactive Ship Maintenance Facility in Philadelphia, Pennsylvania. The ship was struck from the Naval Vessel Register in 2008 and is awaiting disposal.

Design and description
However, the traditional bow door form for LSTs would not be capable. Therefore, the designers of the Newport class came up with a design of a traditional ship hull with a  aluminum ramp slung over the bow supported by two derrick arms. This made the Newport class the first to depart from the standard LST design that had been developed in early World War II.

Boulder was fitted with six Alco 16-645-ES diesel engines turning two shafts, three to each shaft. The ship was also equipped with a bow thruster to allow for better maneuvering near causeways and to hold position while offshore during the unloading of amphibious vehicles.

The Newport class were larger and faster than previous LSTs and were able to transport tanks, heavy vehicles and engineer groups and supplies that were too large for helicopters or smaller landing craft to carry. The LSTs have a ramp forward of the superstructure that connects the lower tank deck with the main deck and a passage large enough to allow access to the parking area amidships. The vessels are also equipped with a stern gate to allow the unloading of amphibious vehicles directly into the water or to unload onto a utility landing craft (LCU) or pier. At either end of the tank deck there is a  turntable that permits vehicles to turn around without having to reverse. The vessels also have davits for four vehicle and personnel landing craft (LCVPs) and could carry four pontoon causeway sections along the sides of the hull.

Boulder was initially armed with four Mark 33 /50 caliber guns in two twin turrets. The vessel was equipped with two Mk 63 gun control fire systems (GCFS) for the 3-inch guns, but these were removed in 1977–1978. The ship also had SPS-10 surface search radar. Atop the stern gate, the vessels mounted a helicopter deck. They had a maximum complement of 213 including 11 officers.

Construction and career
The LST was ordered as the third hull of the third group in Fiscal Year 1967 and a contract was awarded on 15 July 1966. The ship was laid down on 6 September 1969 at San Diego, by the National Steel and Shipbuilding Company. Named for a county in Colorado, Boulder was launched on 22 April 1970, sponsored by the wife of Senator Gordon L. Allott. The LST was commissioned on 4 June 1971 at Long Beach, California and assigned to the Amphibious Force, Atlantic Fleet, with the home port of Little Creek, Virginia.

Into 1980, Boulder alternated amphibious training operations along the east coast of the United States and in the Caribbean Sea with regular, extended deployments to the Mediterranean Sea. On 1 December 1980, the LST was transferred to the Naval Reserve Force.  Boulder was awarded the Meritorious Unit Commendation for removal and disposal of ordnance from the Suez Canal in 1974. On 13 September 1988, Boulder ran aground on a shoal northeast of Frøya in a Norwegian fjord during the NATO military exercise Teamwork '88. During the grounding,  of diesel oil spilled from the LST. A Norwegian tugboat was dispatched to help dislodge Boulder.

Boulder was decommissioned on 28 February 1994 and was placed in inactive reserve at the Naval Inactive Ship Maintenance Facility (NISMF) in Philadelphia, Pennsylvania. On 1 December 2008 she was struck from the Naval Vessel Register and, is awaiting disposal. On 16 March 2022, Boulder was removed from the Philadelphia NIMSF. The vessel was towed to Brownsville, Texas, where the ship will be scrapped.

See also

Citations

References
 
 
 
 
 
 
 
 
 
 

 

Newport-class tank landing ships
Ships built in San Diego
1970 ships